Misogawa Dam is a dam of Kiso River in the Nagano Prefecture, Japan, completed in 1996.

See also 
 Kiso River

References 

Dams in Nagano Prefecture
Dams completed in 1996